XHJL-FM is a radio station on 99.3 FM in Guamúchil, Sinaloa. It is owned by Grupo Chávez Radio and known as La JL with a news/talk format.

History
XEJL-AM 1400 received its concession on December 20, 1958. The 1,000-watt station, which by the 1960s was broadcasting on 1300 kHz, was owned by Francisco Bartolo Meza.

XEJL migrated to FM in 2011 as XHJL-FM 99.3.

La JL is one of three talk-formatted stations owned by Grupo Chávez Radio in Sinaloa: the others are XHTNT-FM in Los Mochis and XHGS-FM in Guasave.

References

Radio stations in Sinaloa
Radio stations established in 1958